John Joseph "Jay" Tharp Jr. (born September 18, 1960) is a United States district judge of the United States District Court for the Northern District of Illinois.

Biography

John J. Tharp Jr. was born in Camp Lejeune, North Carolina. He received his Bachelor of Arts degree, summa cum laude, from Duke University in 1982. Following his graduation, he served for five years in the United States Marine Corps as a commissioned officer, attaining the rank of captain. He received his Juris Doctor, magna cum laude, from the Northwestern University School of Law in 1990. He served as a law clerk for Judge Joel Flaum of the United States Court of Appeals for the Seventh Circuit from 1990 to 1991. He worked as an associate at Kirkland & Ellis from 1991 to 1992. He served as an Assistant United States Attorney in the Northern District of Illinois from 1992 to 1997. From 1997 until 2012, he was an associate and then a partner at the law firm of Mayer Brown LLP. He was the co-chair of the Securities Litigation and Enforcement Practice at that firm.

Federal judicial service

On July 31, 2008, President George W. Bush nominated Tharp to replace Mark Filip on the United States District Court for the Northern District of Illinois. The nomination was made with less than six months remaining in the Bush Presidency and was returned after not being acted upon by the 110th Congress.

On July 5, 2011, Senator Mark Kirk, an Illinois Republican, recommended to Barack Obama, a Democrat, that Tharp be appointed to the United States District Court for the Northern District of Illinois. The recommendation stemmed from a long-standing tradition in Illinois that, when the state is represented in the Senate by a Democrat and a Republican, the senator from the president's party gets to recommend candidates for two in every three judicial vacancies and the other senator chooses candidates for one in three.

On November 10, 2011, President Barack Obama nominated John J. Tharp Jr. to be a District Judge on the United States District Court for the Northern District of Illinois, filling the vacancy created when Judge Blanche M. Manning assumed senior status in 2010. Tharp received his hearing by the Senate Judiciary Committee on January 26, 2012 and his nomination was reported to the Senate floor on February 16, 2012 by a voice vote, with Senator Mike Lee recording the only no vote.

On May 14, 2012, the Senate voted 86–1 to confirm Tharp to the judgeship, with Senator Lee casting the lone nay vote.  "I'm honored by both the nomination and the confirmation," Tharp told the Chicago Tribune shortly after the vote.  "It's a real credit to both our senators that they worked together to get this done." He received his commission on May 16, 2012.

References

External links

1960 births
Living people
Assistant United States Attorneys
Duke University alumni
Illinois lawyers
Judges of the United States District Court for the Northern District of Illinois
Military personnel from North Carolina
Northwestern University Pritzker School of Law alumni
People from Jacksonville, North Carolina
United States district court judges appointed by Barack Obama
21st-century American judges
United States Marine Corps officers
United States Marine Corps reservists
United States Navy reservists
People associated with Kirkland & Ellis
People associated with Mayer Brown